Afton Township is a township in Ward County, North Dakota, United States.

References

Townships in Ward County, North Dakota
Minot, North Dakota micropolitan area
Townships in North Dakota